Budrakh is a village in Maharajpur tehsil, in the district of Chhatarpur, Madhya Pradesh, India. It is a gram panchayat.

Its location code or village code 457797.

The total area of the village is 1146.74 hectares and its total population in 2011 was 1,776 people.

References

Villages in Chhatarpur district